Spion Kop is a mountain in the province of KwaZulu-Natal, South Africa. It is located near the town of Ladysmith, 27 km to the WSW and about 2.5 km to the north of the Spioenkop Dam, a reservoir for the waters of the Tugela River.

History
This mountain has historical significance. Its hilltop was the site of the Battle of Spion Kop (one of the most important battles of the Boer Wars) from 23 to 24 January 1900. near the Tugela River, Natal in South Africa

Spion Kop Nature Reserve is located beneath the southern side of this mountain.

See also
Battle of Spion Kop
Spion Kop Battlefield Memorials
Spioenkop Dam
Spion Kop (stadiums)
 SAS Spioenkop (F147) - a Valour-class frigate of the South African Navy

References

External links

 Fun Things To Do in Province of KwaZulu-Natal
The Battlefields Route

Mountains of KwaZulu-Natal